The Aeolian wall lizard (Podarcis raffonei), also known commonly as Raffone's wall lizard, is a species of lizard in the family Lacertidae. The species is endemic to Italy.

Etymology
The specific name, raffonei or raffoneae, is in honor of Dr. Antonia Raffone, wife of Dr. Antonino Trischitta. Dr. Trischitta was the collector of the holotype.

Habitat
The natural habitats of P. raffonei are Mediterranean-type shrubby vegetation and rocky shores.

Geographic range
There are only four locations hosting P. raffonei, all of them in the Aeolian Islands: the island of Strombolicchio, a small islet off the coast of the nearby island of Salina, another off the coast of the island of Filicudi, and some areas of Vulcano.

Conservation status
The overall population of P. raffonei is around one thousand specimens distributed on a surface not bigger than 20,000 m2 (.008 mi2). It is believed that once this rare lizard inhabited a larger area, but the competition with the very common Italian wall lizard, introduced by man, reduced its distribution to a smaller area.

References

Further reading
Mertens R (1952) "Neue Eidechsenrassen von den Liparischen Inseln ". Senckenbergiana 32 (5/6): 309-314 + Plates 1–2. (Lacerta sicula raffonei, new subspecies, pp. 313–314 + Plate 2, figure 3). (in German).

Podarcis
Lizards of Europe
Endemic fauna of Italy
Reptiles described in 1952
Taxa named by Robert Mertens
Taxonomy articles created by Polbot